A local election  was held in the Mexican state of Nuevo León on Sunday, June 7, 2015, to elect, on the local level:

Governor of Nuevo León
51 municipal presidents (mayors) to serve for a three-year term. (they will be for the first time eligible for reelection)
42 local deputies (26 by the first-past-the-post system and 16 by proportional representation) to serve for a three-year term in the Congress of Nuevo León.

Gubernatorial election
Ten candidates ran for Governor of Nuevo Leon including, for the first time, an independent candidate. Two of the candidates, Fernando Elizondo and Raul Guajardo did not completed the campaign since both decided to decline and supported Jaime Rodriguez Calderon.

References

External links
Electoral Institute of Nuevo León website

2015 elections in Mexico
2015